Aula may refer to:

Avola, a city in Sicily (Àula in Sicilian)
Aula, Eritrea, a village in western Eritrea
Aula (river), a river of Hesse, Germany
AULA, a Canadian standard for advanced ultra-light aeroplanes

See also 
 Aula regia, the great hall in an imperial or royal palace
 Aula Palatina, a Roman palace basilica in Trier, Germany
 Aula Al Ayoubi, Syrian painter and visual artist
 Aula-Vintri, a village in Estonia